"Hei tie" (in English, "Hey There, Road") is a song by Finnish recording artist Maija Vilkkumaa. It was released by Warner Music Finland on 20 September 2006, as the only single from her compilation album Totuutta ja tehtävää. Written by Vilkkumaa, the song was Vilkkumaa's first number-one single on the Finnish Singles Chart, debuting at the peak position and charting for three weeks.

Track listing and formats
Digital download

See also
List of number-one singles of 2006 (Finland)

References

2006 singles
Maija Vilkkumaa songs
Songs written by Maija Vilkkumaa
Number-one singles in Finland